Peter Huber (born 16 February 1930) is an Austrian diver. He competed in the men's 3 metre springboard event at the 1960 Summer Olympics.

References

External links
 
 

1930 births
Living people
Austrian male divers
Olympic divers of Austria
Divers at the 1960 Summer Olympics
Divers from Vienna